The Dovekeepers is a 2011 historical novel by American writer Alice Hoffman. The novel dramatizes the Siege of Masada (73–74 CE) by troops of the Roman Empire towards the end of the First Jewish–Roman War (66–73 CE).

Television film

A two-part television adaptation of the same name from executive producers Roma Downey and Mark Burnett premiered in the United States on March 31, 2015, on CBS. It stars Cote de Pablo as Shirah.

See also

 List of historical novels
 Masada – a 1981 television dramatization of the events at Masada

References

2011 American novels
1st-century Judaism
American novels adapted into films
First Jewish–Roman War
Masada
Novels set in Asia
Novels set in the 1st century
War novels set in the Roman Empire
American novels adapted into television shows
Charles Scribner's Sons books